Billy the Kid's Fighting Pals (also known as Trigger Men) is a 1941 American Western directed by Sam Newfield for Producers Releasing Corporation (PRC), and the fifth in PRC's Billy the Kid film series.

Plot
Billy the Kid (Bob Steele) and his friends Jeff (Carleton Young) and Fuzzy (Al St. John) are on the run. They make it to Paradise Town, where the trio witnesses the murder of Marshal Mason (Stanley Price). Fuzzy poses as the marshal and rides into the town, which is now ruled by a gang led by Burke (Curley Dresden) under orders from a prominent businessman in Paradise. Setting out to put an end to the gang's lawless rule over the town, the trio face another problem—the ward of the town banker Hardy (Edward Peil, Sr.), Ann (Phyllis Adair), who is out to set obstacles for them for unknown reasons. Along the journey they befriend Mexican secret agent Lopez (Julian Rivero), who is posing as a bartender. As the plot thickens, it is revealed that the true mastermind is Hardy, who plans on buying up all the local property to dig a smuggling tunnel to Mexico.

Cast

 Bob Steele as Billy the Kid
 Carleton Young as Jeff
 Al St. John as Fuzzy
 Edward Peil, Sr. as Hardy
 Phyllis Adair as Ann
 Stanley Price as Marshall Mason
 Julian Rivero as Lopez
 Curley Dresden as Burke
 Budd Buster as Editor Mason

Release
Billy the Kid's Fighting Pals was commercially released on 18 April 1941 in the U.S. through Producers Releasing Corporation.

See also
The "Billy the Kid" films starring Bob Steele:
 Billy the Kid Outlawed (1940)
 Billy the Kid in Texas (1940)
 Billy the Kid's Gun Justice (1940)
 Billy the Kid's Range War (1941)
 Billy the Kid's Fighting Pals (1941)
 Billy the Kid in Santa Fe (1941)

References

External links
 

1941 films
1941 Western (genre) films
American Western (genre) films
American black-and-white films
Films directed by Sam Newfield
Billy the Kid (film series)
Films with screenplays by George H. Plympton
1940s American films